Tyrone de la Bastide (18 October 1938 – 23 March 2008) was a Trinidad and Tobago footballer.

References

1938 births
2008 deaths
Trinidad and Tobago footballers
Trinidad and Tobago international footballers
Association football defenders
Pan American Games medalists in football
Pan American Games bronze medalists for Trinidad and Tobago
Footballers at the 1967 Pan American Games
Medalists at the 1967 Pan American Games